Mona Singh (born 8 October 1981) is an Indian actress, dancer, model, comedian and television presenter. Having first gained prominence in 2000s for playing the eponymous heroine in the soap opera series Jassi Jaissi Koi Nahin (2003–06), she has since appeared in several other television and film roles. Singh is the recipient of two Indian Television Academy Awards.

Singh is also known for participating and winning the first season of the reality series Jhalak Dikhhla Jaa, and for playing Mona in Kya Huaa Tera Vaada, Preet Singh in Pyaar Ko Ho Jaane Do, and Paridhi in Kavach... Kaali Shaktiyon Se. She made her film debut with a supporting role in Rajkumar Hirani's comedy-drama 3 Idiots (2009), which is one of the highest-grossing Indian films of all time.

She was also praised for her roles of Ananya Sharma and Poorva Gupta in Kehne Ko Humsafar Hain and Yeh Meri Family (both 2018) respectively. Outside of acting, she has also hosted such television shows as Comedy Nights Live and Entertainment Ke Liye Kuch Bhi Karega.

Early life
Mona Singh was born on 8 October 1981 in a Sikh family in Chandigarh. Her father was an Army officer, so she shifted to many place and she is now a prominent alumni of Kendriya Vidyalaya Vayusena Nagar, Nagpur. On December 27, 2019, She married Filmmaker Shyam Rajagopalan in a traditional Sikh ceremony.

Career

Television career

Singh debuted into Hindi television with Sony Entertainment Television's iconic and super-hit soap opera Jassi Jaissi Koi Nahin (2003–06) in which she gained popularity through her work as the sincere, intelligent and naive Jasmeet "Jassi" Walia for consecutively three years. The show made her a household name, and won her many accolades at award functions such as Apsara Awards, Indian Telly Awards and Indian Television Academy Awards.

In 2006, she participated in the reality show Jhalak Dikhhla Jaa 1 and emerged as the winner. She hosted Femina Miss India and Jhalak Dikhhla Jaa 2 in 2007, followed by her participation and win in Ek Khiladi Ek Haseena in 2008.

Singh then teamed up with Ekta Kapoor's banner Balaji Telefilms for the first of four consecutive fiction show collaborations in NDTV Imagine's Radhaa Ki Betiyaan Kuch Kar Dikhayengi where she was cast as Raunaq Makhija from 2008 to 2009. Shifting her focus to mostly hosting and non fiction shows, she hosted Entertainment Ke Liye Kuch Bhi Karega (2009), Jhalak Dikhhla Jaa 4 (2010), Shaadi 3 Crore Ki (2010), Star Ya Rockstar (2011) and CID Veerta Awards (2012) and was a participant on Meethi Choori No 1 (2010).

By returning to fiction shows, she entered Sony Entertainment Television's Kya Huaa Tera Vaada (produced by Kapoor) in 2012 as Mona, a wife whom her husband leaves and divorces due to an extramarital affair with his former girlfriend. The show ended in 2013, and she took a break from television afterwards also.

Two years later Singh made a comeback to television in October 2015 with Pyaar Ko Ho Jaane Do, her third consecutive show to be produced by Kapoor where she played Preet Singh, a woman who lost her parents. Due to low TRPs, Pyaar Ko Ho Jaane Do went off air within three months in January 2016. Later in 2016 she featured in Kapoor's supernatural production Kavach...Kaali Shaktiyon Se as Paridhi, a married woman attempting to protect her husband from his former lover who has turned into a spirit post death and arrived to haunt the couple, and hosted Comedy Nights Bachao.

In September 2021, she hosted the &TV's show Mauka-E-Vardaat.

Web series career

In 2018, Singh ventured into web world with her portrayal of Ananya in Kehne Ko Humsafar Hain. That year she also starred in The Viral Fever and Netflix series Yeh Meri Family. In 2019, she was seen in ZEE5 and ALT Balaji series Mission Over Mars. She next appeared in Black Widows on ZEE5.

Film career

She next appeared in Utt Pataang, Zed Plus and Amavas.

Her recent film was Laal Singh Chaddha, which was released in  2022, where she enacted another supporting character.

Filmography

Films

Television

Fiction

Reality Show

Web series

Awards and nominations

See also

 List of Indian film actresses
 List of Indian television actresses
 List of Hindi television actresses

References

External links 

 
 
 

 

Living people
Indian television actresses
1981 births
Dancing with the Stars winners
Indian women television presenters
Indian television presenters
Indian Sikhs
Punjabi people
Female models from Chandigarh
Actresses from Chandigarh
Indian soap opera actresses